Lake Steilacoom is a reservoir approximately 4 km (2.5 mi) southwest of Tacoma in Pierce County, Washington, United States. Its boundaries lie entirely within the city of Lakewood, Washington. Lake Steilacoom is a freshwater lake and drains into Puget Sound via Chambers Creek, which begins at its northern tip. The lake is fed at its southeastern end by two creeks: Ponce de Leon Creek, which originates in springs below what is now Lakewood Towne Center, as well as Clover Creek which flows from its source near Frederickson to the lake.

The reservoir was created in 1853 when Andrew Byrd built a dam across Chambers Creek, flooding what had previously been a small pond in a wetland. The dam was used for his sawmill (also built in 1853) and a grist mill (100 yards downstream, in 1857).  A public boat launch can be found on the eastern shore in Edgewater Park.

The smaller pond was known as Lake Wyatchew prior to the dam's installation, and was briefly known later as Byrd's lake.

The Rhodesleigh mansion is located by the lake.

The Nisqually Indians say this lake was possessed by an evil female monster known as Whe-atchee. Legends of the creature attacking people go back over a century. To this day, Nisqually refuse to fish or swim here.

External links
Lake Steilacoom Improvement Club, including history

References

Steilacoom
Steilacoom
Lakewood, Washington
Protected areas of Pierce County, Washington